Rockland is the third solo album by Canadian rock musician Kim Mitchell, released in 1989. The album was the fourth-best selling Cancon album in Canada of 1989. "Rock n Roll Duty" was second-most played Cancon song in Canada of 1989, while "Rocklandwonderland" was the ninth-most played Cancon song in Canada that year. The album was certified double platinum in Canada. Rockland was released internationally on the Atlantic Records label.

Track listing
All songs by Kim Mitchell and Pye Dubois, except "The Great Embrace" by Mitchell, Dubois and Todd Booth
 "Rocklandwonderland" – 4:19
 "Lost Lovers Found"– 5:07
 "Rock n Roll Duty"– 3:20
 "Tangle of Love"– 4:45
 "Moodstreet"– 4:23
 "The Crossroads"– 4:25
 "Expedition Sailor"– 4:25
 "O Mercy Louise"– 3:58
 "This Dream"– 4:33
 "The Great Embrace" – 5:29

Personnel
Credits taken from album booklet.
Musicians
Kim Mitchell – lead guitar, vocals
Greg Wells – keyboards, backing vocals
Kim Bullard – keyboards
Matthew Gerrard – bass
Lou Molino – drums
Peter Fredette, Floyd Bell – backing vocals
Pat Mastelotto – programming
Pye Dubois – lyrics

Additional musicians
Rik Emmett – acoustic guitar in "Expedition Sailor"
Sheree Jeacocke – backing vocals on "Moodstreet"

Production
Paul DeVilliers, Paul La Chapelle, Phil Kaffel – engineers
Brian Foraker, Noel Golden – mixing at  Metalworks Studios, Mississauga
Greg Fulginiti – mastering at Artisan Sound Recorders
Hugh Syme – art direction and design
Dimo Safari – photography
W. Tom Berry – executive producer

References

Resources
http://www.kimmitchell.ca

1989 albums
Kim Mitchell albums
Atlantic Records albums
Alert Records albums